The Venezuelan SuperLiga MVP, previously the Liga Profesional de Baloncesto (LPB) MVP is an annual award that is handed out to the most valuable player of a given season of the LPB season, the highest professional basketball league in Venezuela.

Winners

Winners by team

References

External links

 Liga Profesional de Baloncesto
 Venezuelan awards